The Women's Hong Kong Basketball Association is the highest women's professional club basketball competition in Hong Kong.

History

Champions

List of champions

External links
 Profile at asia-basket.com

Hong Kong
Basketball in Hong Kong